Scoro is a software-as-a-service solution for professional and creative services. The all-in-one business management software combines project management with time and team management, sales, billing, and professional services automation. The company has offices in London, New York, Tallinn, Riga, and Vilnius.

History 
Scoro was founded in 2013, in Tallinn, Estonia.

In August 2016, Scoro secured $1.9 million in investment capital during its Seed round of funding, which was led by three VCs: Inventure, SmartCap, and Alchemist Accelerator. In November 2018, Scoro closed a $5 million Series A round led by Livonia Partners with participation from existing investors Inventure and Tera Ventures. The deal brings the total amount raised from investors to $6.9 million.

The company has been named one of the fastest growing technology firms in Central Europe by the Deloitte Technology Fast 500. Scoro has also been featured on the Inc. magazine's Inc. 5000 list as one of the fastest-growing private companies in America. In 2019 Scoro was named as one of the hottest young companies across Europe and Israel by TNW.

Software

Mobile 
Scoro introduced its version 1.0 iOS and Android application in 2016, allowing users to work from their iPhone or Android devices.

Recognition and awards

2017 
 Technology Fast 50 by Deloitte

2018 
 Inc. 5000 fastest-growing companies in America
 Easiest to Use Business Process Management Software by G2

2019 
 Best Software Companies in EMEA by G2
 FrontRunners for Project Management by Software Advice
 Category leader for Business Management category by GetApp
 Category leader for Project Management category by GetApp
 Easiest to Use Business Software by G2

References 

Collaborative software
Project management software
Software companies of Estonia
Software companies based in London
British companies established in 2013